Pool A of the 2015 Fed Cup Europe/Africa Group III was one of four pools in the Europe/Africa Group III of the 2015 Fed Cup. Three teams competed in a round robin competition, with the top team and bottom teams proceeding to their respective sections of the play-offs: the top team played for advancement to Group II.

Standings

Round-robin

Cyprus vs. Iceland

Lithuania vs. Iceland

Lithuania vs. Cyprus

See also
Fed Cup structure

References

External links
 Fed Cup website

A3